The Ushitsa uezd was one of the uezds (uyezds or subdivisions) of the Podolia Governorate of the Russian Empire. It was situated in the northwestern part of the governorate. Its administrative centre was Nova Ushytsia (Novaya Ushitsa).

Demographics
At the time of the Russian Empire Census of 1897, Ushitsky Uyezd had a population of 223,312. Of these, 84.6% spoke Ukrainian, 11.4% Yiddish, 2.3% Russian, 1.2% Polish, 0.4% German and 0.1% Moldovan or Romanian as their native language.

References

 
Uezds of Podolia Governorate